Adyghe may refer to:
Adyghe people, a people of the northwest Caucasus region
Adyghe language, the language of the Adyghe people
Adyghe phonology
Adyghe grammar
Adyghe Autonomous Oblast, an autonomous oblast of the Russian SFSR which existed from 1922 to 1991

See also
Republic of Adygea, one of the republics of Russia and the successor of the Adyghe Autonomous Oblast

Language and nationality disambiguation pages